René Lavoie (July 24, 1921 – December 12, 2000) was a Canadian politician from Quebec.

Background

He was born on July 24, 1921 in Disraeli, Chaudière-Appalaches.

Member of the legislature

Lavoie unsuccessfully ran as a Union Nationale candidate in the 1960 election in the district of Wolfe.  He was elected in the 1962 election and was re-elected in the 1966 and 1970 elections.

He served as parliamentary assistant from 1966 to 1970 and as his party's House Whip from 1966 until 1973.  He did not run for re-election in the 1973 election.

Local Politics

Lavoie also served as a school board member in Disraeli from 1964 to 1966.

Death

He died on December 12, 2000.

References

1921 births
2000 deaths
Union Nationale (Quebec) MNAs